Raymond Bru (30 March 1906 – December 1989) was a Belgian fencer. He won a bronze medal in the team foil event at the 1948 Summer Olympics.

References

1906 births
1989 deaths
Belgian male fencers
Olympic fencers of Belgium
Fencers at the 1928 Summer Olympics
Fencers at the 1936 Summer Olympics
Fencers at the 1948 Summer Olympics
Olympic bronze medalists for Belgium
Olympic medalists in fencing
Medalists at the 1948 Summer Olympics
20th-century Belgian people